Morozovka is a rural locality (a village) in Kupriyanovskoye Rural Settlement, Gorokhovetsky District, Vladimir Oblast, Russia. The population was 118 as of 2010.

Geography 
Morozovka is located 4 km south of Gorokhovets (the district's administrative centre) by road. Vyezd is the nearest rural locality.

References 

Rural localities in Gorokhovetsky District